The Compañía de Acero del Pacífico, also known by its acronym CAP, is the main iron and steel industry of Chile with its main facilities at Huachipato near the port of Talcahuano in Bío Bío Region.

As result of Allende's nationalization of the mining industry in the early 1970s Compañía de Acero del Pacífico obtained ownership of the iron mine of El Tofo and El Romeral. Later the ownership of this mine passed to Compañía Minera del Pacífico as it was privatized during the Pinochet dictatorship.

References

Ironworks and steelworks in Chile
Manufacturing companies established in 1946
Steel companies of Chile
Companies based in Biobío Region
Mining companies of Chile
Chilean companies established in 1946
Iron mining in Chile
Companies listed on the Santiago Stock Exchange

es:Compañía de Acero del Pacífico